Drug-induced angioedema is a known complication of the use of angiotensin-converting enzyme (ACE) inhibitors, angiotensin II antagonists (ARBs), and Angiotensin-Neprilysin Inhibitor LCZ969.  The angioedema appears to be dose dependent as it may resolve with decreased dose.

Presentation
Angioedema presents itself as an abrupt onset of non-pitting, non-itchy swelling that involves the mucosal layers. Some common locations of angioedema are the face, particularly the lips and around the eyes, hands and feet, and genitalia. A rare, yet serious complication is one inside the abdomen, the symptom usually being severe stomach upset, which is much less obvious than the other locations.

Risk factor
Some common ACE Inhibitors are:
 Benazepril (Lotensin)
 Captopril (Capoten)
 Enalapril (Vasotec)
 Lisinopril (Prinivil, Zestril)
 Ramipril (Altace)

Some common ARBs are:
 Candesartan (Atacand)
 Losartan (Cozaar)
 Olmesartan (Benicar)
 Valsartan (Diovan)

Incidence
The chance of drug-induced angioedema is extremely uncommon, however, as studies show incidence of less than 1%. The reason this adverse effect may occur is due to the build-up of bradykinin, a vasodilator. This causes blood vessels to dilate and allow for fluid buildup in the mucosal surfaces.

See also
 Angioedema
 Skin lesion

References

2. Angiotensin-Neprilysin Inhibition versus Enalapril in Heart Failure (PARADIGM-HF Investigators); NEJM.org, September 11, 2014; Vol.371, No.11.

External links 

Drug eruptions
Drug-induced diseases